Imperia Oneglia railway station served the city of Imperia, in the Liguria region, northwestern Italy. Opened in 1872, it formed part of the Genoa–Ventimiglia railway, and was situated just over two thirds along the way from Genoa towards Ventimiglia. It was replaced on 11 December 2016, along with Imperia's other former railway station, Imperia Porto Maurizio,  to the west, by a new station, simply named Imperia, situated on a new double-track line replacing the old coastal route.

Train services 
The station was last served by the following service(s):

Regional services (Treno regionale) Ventimiglia - Savona - Genoa - Sestri Levante - La Spezia - San Stefano di Magra

See also 

History of rail transport in Italy
List of railway stations in Liguria
Rail transport in Italy
Railway stations in Italy

References 

This article is based upon a translation of the Italian language version as at May 2017.

External links 

Province of Imperia
Railway stations in Liguria
Railway stations opened in 1872
Railway stations closed in 2016